The following lists events that happened during 1990 in the Grand Duchy of Luxembourg.

Incumbents

Events
 29 April – A memorial to Grand Duchess Charlotte is opened in Luxembourg City.
 5 May – Representing Luxembourg, Celine Carzo finishes thirteenth in the Eurovision Song Contest 1990 with the song Quand je te rêve.
 7 December – Cargolux orders six Boeing 747-400s.
 Unknown – France's Christophe Lavainne wins the 1990 Tour de Luxembourg.

Births
 17 November – Prince Wenceslas of Nassau

Deaths
 1 August – Robert Krieps, politician
 10 October – René Urbany, politician and journalist
 4 November – Henry Cravatte, politician

Footnotes

 
Years of the 20th century in Luxembourg
Luxembourg